Albania participated in the Eurovision Song Contest 2007 in Helsinki, Finland, with the song "Hear My Plea" performed by Frederik Ndoci and Aida Ndoci. Its selected entry was chosen through the national selection competition Festivali i Këngës organised by Radio Televizioni Shqiptar (RTSH) in December 2006. Due to the non-top 11 result in the previous contest, Albania was drawn to compete in the semi-final of the contest, which took place on 10 May 2007. Performing as number 11, the nation was not announced among the top 10 entries of the semi-final and therefore failed to qualify for the grand final, marking Albania's second non-qualification in the contest.

Background 

The nation's highest placing in the contest, to this point, had been the seventh place, which it achieved in 2004 with the song "The Image of You" performed by Anjeza Shahini. Albania's national broadcaster, Radio Televizioni Shqiptar (RTSH), has organised Festivali i Këngës since its inauguration in 1962. Since 2003, the winner of the competition has simultaneously won the right to represent Albania in the Eurovision Song Contest.

Before Eurovision

Festivali i Këngës 

RTSH organised the 45th edition of Festivali i Këngës to determine Albania's representative for the Eurovision Song Contest 2007. The competition consisted of two semi-finals on 21 and 22 December, respectively, and the grand final on 23 December 2006. The three live shows were hosted by Albanian presenter Adi Krasta, actress Ermela Teli and singer Vesa Luma.

Competing entries

Shows

Semi-finals 

The semi-finals of Festivali i Këngës took place on 21 December and 22 December 2006, respectively. 15 contestants participated in the first semi-final and 16 in the second, with the highlighted ones progressing to the grand final.

Final 
The grand final of Festivali i Këngës took place on 23 December 2006 and was broadcast at 21:00 (CET). Frederik Ndoci and Aida Ndoci emerged as the winners with "Balada e gurit" and were simultaneously announced as representing Albania in the Eurovision Song Contest 2007.

At Eurovision 

The Eurovision Song Contest 2007 took place at Hartwall Arena in Helsinki, Finland, and consisted of a semi-final on 10 May and the grand final on 12 May 2007. Due to its non-top 11 result in the 2006 contest, Albania was required to compete in the semi-final. At the end of the semi-final, the country was not announced among the top 10 entries and therefore failed to qualify for the final, marking Albania's second non-qualification in the Eurovision Song Contest.

Voting 

The tables below visualise a breakdown of points awarded to Albania in the semi-final of the Eurovision Song Contest 2007, as well as by the country for the semi-final and grand final, respectively.

Points awarded to Albania

Points awarded by Albania

References 

2007
Countries in the Eurovision Song Contest 2007
2006
Eurovision